Valcar–Travel & Service is a professional road bicycle racing women's team which participates in elite women's races.

Team roster

Major results

2017
  Sprints classification Giro della Toscana Int. Femminile – Memorial Michela Fanini, Elisa Balsamo

2018
Omloop van Borsele, Elisa Balsamo
 Points classification Giro Toscana Int. Femminile - Memorial Michela Fanini, Maria Giulia Confalonieri
Young rider classification Giro delle Marche, Dalia Muccioli
Stage 1, Dalia Muccioli
 Points classification Madrid Challenge by la Vuelta, Ilaria Sanguineti
Gran Premio Bruno Beghelli Internazionale Donne Elite, Elisa Balsamo

2019
Trofee Maarten Wynants, Elisa Balsamo
Stage 3 Tour of California, Elisa Balsamo
Dwars door de Westhoek, Elisa Balsamo
Stage 5 Boels Ladies Tour, Chiara Consonni
Stage 1 Giro delle Marche in Rosa, Marta Cavalli
Stage 2 Giro delle Marche in Rosa, Elisa Balsamo

2021
Ronde de Mouscron, Chiara Consonni

2022
Dwars door Vlaanderen, Chiara Consonni
Gran Premio della Liberazione, Silvia Persico
Gran Premio Ciudad de Eibar, Olivia Baril
Memorial Monica Bandini, Silvia Persico
Team classification RideLondon Classique
Dwars door de Westhoek, Chiara Consonni
Dwars door het Hageland, Ilaria Sanguinetti
SPAR Flanders Diamond Tour, Chiara Consonni
Stage 10 Giro d'Italia Donne, Chiara Consonni
MerXem Classic, Eleonora Gasparini
Stage 3 Giro Toscana Int. Femminile - Memorial Michela Fanini, Karolina Kumiega
Stage 4 Ceratizit Challenge by La Vuelta, Silvia Persico
Grand Prix International d'Isbergues, Chiara Consonni

National & continental champions

2017
 European U23 Track (Team pursuit), Marta Cavalli
 European U23 Track (Team pursuit), Elisa Balsamo
 European U23 Track (Omnium), Elisa Balsamo
 European Track (Team pursuit), Elisa Balsamo
2018
 Italian Road Race, Marta Cavalli
 European Track (Points race), Maria Giulia Confalonieri
 Italian Track (Madison), Elisa Balsamo
 Italian Track (Madison), Maria Giulia Confalonieri
2019
 European Track (Points race), Maria Giulia Confalonieri
2020
 European U23 Track (Team pursuit), Vittoria Guazzini
 European U23 Track (Team pursuit), Marta Cavalli
 European U23 Track (Team pursuit), Chiara Consonni
 Italian Track (500m Time Trial), Miriam Vece
 Italian Track (Individual Sprint), Miriam Vece
2022
 Latvia Road Race, Anastasia Carbonari
 Afghanistan Road Race, Fariba Hashimi

References

External links

UCI Women's Teams
Cycling teams based in Italy
Cycling teams established in 2017